Kosta Bjedov (born 10 May 1986) is a Serbian retired footballer who last played for Čukarički.

References

External links
MFK Košice Profile

1986 births
Living people
Association football forwards
Serbian footballers
FK Železnik players
FC VSS Košice players
Sliema Wanderers F.C. players
Qormi F.C. players
FK Čukarički players
Shanghai Port F.C. players
China League One players
Slovak Super Liga players
Expatriate footballers in Slovakia
Expatriate footballers in Malta
Sportspeople from Knin
Expatriate footballers in China
Serbian expatriate sportspeople in China
Serbian expatriate sportspeople in Slovakia
Serbian expatriate sportspeople in Malta